Jacques Georges Aubuchon (October 30, 1924 – December 28, 1991) was an  American actor who appeared in films, stage, and on television in the 1950s, 1960s, 1970s, and 1980s.

Aubuchon, who grew up in Fitchburg, Massachusetts, was the son of Arthur and Flora Aubuchon. He went to Assumption Preparatory School and served in the US Army during World War II. During his working career, Aubuchon made over 300 television appearances, made two dozen films, did hundreds of television commercials, plus wrote plays.

One of Aubuchon's best known roles was as Chief Urulu on McHale's Navy. Aubuchon's first part on Broadway was as the sewerman in The Madwoman of Chaillot and Paris 7000 was the first television show that he had a regular part on.

Aubuchon, who was the father of television writer and producer Remi Aubuchon and father-in-law of Dirk Blocker, died of heart failure at the age of 67.

Partial TV and movie filmography

Mister Peepers (1953) - August Hempel
Beneath the 12-Mile Reef (1953) - Demetrios Sofotes
Operation Manhunt (1954) - Volov
The Silver Chalice (1954) - Nero
The Scarlet Hour (1956) - Fat Boy
Gunsmoke (1956-1975, TV Series) - Linder Hogue / Bert Clum / Torp / Short
The Big Boodle (1957) - Miguel Collada
The Way to the Gold (1957) - Clem Williams
Gun Glory (1957) - Sam Winscott
The Restless Gun (1958) Episode "Strange Family in Town"
Short Cut to Hell (1957) - Bahrwell
Thunder Road (1958) - Carl Kogan
Bat Masterson (1959) - King Louie
The Shaggy Dog (1959) - Stefano
Have Gun Will Travel (1959-1961, TV Series) - Moriarity - Town Bully / Billy Banjo Jones / Judge Wesson
Perry Mason (1959-1964, TV Series) - Roger Brody / Victor Bundy / George Gage / Felix Karr
Wanted Dead or Alive (1960 TV Series) - Peter Kovack
Twenty Plus Two (1961) - Jacques Pleschette
McHale's Navy (1962-1964, TV Series) - Chief Pali Urulu
The Twilight Zone (1963, TV Series) - Connolly
Wild and Wonderful (1964) - Papa Ponchon - Giselle's Father
The Man from U.N.C.L.E. (1964, TV Series) - Emil
Combat! (1965) in 4th-season episode "Evasion" - Kopke
McHale's Navy Joins the Air Force (1965) - Dimitri
The Monkees (1966, TV Series) - Boris
Hogan's Heroes (1966, TV Series) - General von Kattenhorn
F Troop (1966, TV Series) - Gideon D. Jeffries
Johnny Belinda (1967, TV Movie) - Pacquet
Garrison's Gorillas (1967, TV Series) - Ettienne
Bewitched (1967, TV Series) - Phineas
Tarzan (1968-1969, TV Series) - Captain / Joppo
Judd for the Defense (1969, TV Series) - John Morgan
Land of the Giants (1969, TV Series) - Zurpin
The Love God? (1969) - Carter Fenton
Black Water Gold (1970, TV Movie) - Kefalos
Paris 7000 (1970, TV Series) - Lt. Maurois / Police Lieutenant
The Hoax (1972) - Chief Belkins
McCloud (1972, TV Series) - Inspector Lelouch
Columbo (1974, TV Series) - Jeffrey Neal
Apple's Way (1974, TV Series) - Stavros
Marcus Welby, M.D. (1974, TV Series) - Dr. Crayler
Hawaii Five-O (1974, TV Series) - Charles Portman
The Waltons (1974, TV Series) - Victor Povich
Barbary Coast (1975, TV Series) - Mr. Roszack
Jigsaw John (1976, TV Series) - Charles Bouchard
Switch (1976-1978, TV Series) - Arthur Cummings / Adam Hayward / Earl Harper
Project U.F.O. (1978, TV Series) - Marchand
Starsky and Hutch (1978, TV Series) - Davidowsky
Hart to Hart (1980, TV Series) - Maurice Simone
Remington Steele (1984, TV Series) - Professor Arthur Thickett
Highway to Heaven (1984, TV Series) - Clinton Rudd

References

External links

 
 
 

1924 births
1991 deaths
Male actors from Massachusetts
American male film actors
American male radio actors
American male stage actors
American male television actors
People from Fitchburg, Massachusetts
20th-century American male actors
People from Woodland Hills, Los Angeles